Kaso may refer to:
 KASO, an American radio station broadcasting a Classic Hits format
 Kasō, the twelfth single by L'Arc-en-Ciel
 Kásó, a village and municipality in south-eastern Slovakia

See also 
 Kaso River (disambiguation)
 Kasos
 Kazo (disambiguation)
 Caso (disambiguation)